HCC may refer to:

Computing
 Hobby Computer Club, Netherlands
 Holland Computing Center, University of Nebraska
 Human-centered computing

Companies and organizations
 HCC Insurance Holdings, Texas, US
 Hampshire County Council, England
 Hindustan Construction Company, India
 Housing Conservation Coordinators, a tenants' rights organization, Manhattan, New York, US
 Hsinchu County Council,  Taiwan
 NYC Health + Hospitals (New York City Health and Hospitals Corporation), New York City, US

Schools

U.S.
 Hagerstown Community College, Maryland
 Heartland Community College, Normal, Illinois
 Henderson Community College, Henderson, Kentucky
 Highland Community College (Kansas)
 Hillsborough Community College, Florida
 Holyoke Community College, Massachusetts
 Honolulu Community College, Hawaii
 Hopkinsville Community College, Kentucky
 Housatonic Community College, Bridgeport, Connecticut
 Houston Community College System, Texas
 Howard Community College, Maryland
 Hutchinson Community College, Kansas

Elsewhere
 Hailsham Community College, East Sussex, England
 Hameldon Community College, in Burnley, Lancashire, England
 Han Chiang College, Malaysia

Other uses
 HCC (classification), for Paralympic Games cycling
 Hartford Civic Center, Connecticut, US
 Hawaii Cryptologic Center, of U.S. National Security Agency
 Hepatocellular carcinoma, a liver cancer
 Hindustani Covenant Church
 Hoosier Crossroads Conference, an athletic conference, Indiana, US

See also
 Holy Cross College (disambiguation)